William Webber may refer to:
William Webber (criminal) (1877–1936), underworld figure in New York
William Lloyd Webber (1914–1982), English organist and composer
William Webber (bishop) (1837–1903), Anglican bishop of Brisbane
William Webber (surgeon) (1800–1875), English surgeon
Bill Webber (trade unionist) (1901–1982), Welsh trade union leader
Bill "Wee Willie" Webber (1929–2010), Philadelphia TV and radio personality

See also
William Weber (disambiguation)